The Williamson Museum is a local museum established in 1997 focused on the culture and heritage of Williamson County, Texas. The museum is located at 716 S. Austin Ave on the historic square in Georgetown, Texas, in the former Farmers State Bank building. The museum organization is incorporated as a 501(c)(3) non-profit corporation.

See also
 Statue of Robert McAlpin Williamson

References

External links 
 Williamson Museum - official site
 Williamson County Historical Commission
 Williamson County home page

Buildings and structures in Georgetown, Texas
History museums in Texas
1997 establishments in Texas
Museums established in 1997
Museums in Williamson County, Texas